John Duncuft (died 27 July 1852) was a British Peelite politician.

Duncuft was first elected Peelite MP for Oldham in 1847, and held the seat at the next general election in 1852. However, he died just a few months later.

References

External links
 

Conservative Party (UK) MPs for English constituencies
UK MPs 1847–1852
UK MPs 1852–1857
1852 deaths